USS Minah may refer to:

, was launched as PCS‑1465 December 1943, redesignated Minah (AMc‑204) January 1945 and decommissioned September 1959
USS Minah (AM-370), planned as an  had her construction canceled June 1944

United States Navy ship names